A pair in cricket refers to when a batsman is dismissed for a duck (without scoring) in both innings. It is called a 'king pair' if the batsman gets out for a golden duck (getting out on the first ball he faced) in both innings.

The name originates from the two noughts together being thought to resemble a pair of spectacles; the longer form is occasionally used.

Most pairs in a Test career
New Zealand fast bowler Chris Martin has been dismissed without scoring in both innings during seven Test matches, three more than any other player. Five players have been dismissed for four pairs of ducks in Tests. Four are bowlers with no great pretensions towards batsmanship – Bhagwat Chandrasekhar of India, Muttiah Muralitharan of Sri Lanka and West Indians Mervyn Dillon and Courtney Walsh – but the fifth is top order batsman Marvan Atapattu of Sri Lanka. He started his Test career with just one run in six innings – including two pairs – and has bagged two more since.

Pairs on Test debut
45 batsmen have been dismissed for a pair on their debut in Test cricket:
Fred Grace for England v Australia at The Oval in London 1880
Clarence Wimble for South Africa v England at Cape Town in 1891/92
Joseph Willoughby for South Africa v England at Port Elizabeth in 1895/96
Johannes Kotze for South Africa v Australia in Johannesburg in 1902/03
Percy Twentyman-Jones for South Africa v Australia in Cape Town in 1902/03
Tommy Ward for South Africa v Australia in Manchester in 1912
Percy Lewis for South Africa v England in Durban in 1913/14
Cecil Dixon for South Africa v England in Johannesburg in 1913/14
Ted Badcock for New Zealand v England in Christchurch in 1929/30
Ken James for New Zealand v England in Christchurch in 1929/30
Jim Smith for England v West Indies in Bridgetown in 1934/35
Gordon Rowe for New Zealand v Australia in Wellington in 1945/46
Len Butterfield for New Zealand v Australia in Wellington in 1945/46
Cuan McCarthy for South Africa v England in Durban in 1948
Alf Valentine for the West Indies v England in Manchester in 1950
Ram Ramchand for India v England at Headingley in Leeds in 1952
Graham Gooch for England v Australia at Edgbaston in Birmingham in 1975
Brendon Bracewell for New Zealand v England at Lord's in 1978
Mike Whitney for Australia v England in Manchester in 1981
Maninder Singh for India v Pakistan in Karachi in 1982/83
Ken Rutherford for New Zealand v West Indies at Port of Spain in 1984/85
Chris Kuggeleijn for New Zealand v India in Bangalore in 1988/89
Rashid Patel for India v New Zealand in Bombay in 1988/89
Marvan Atapattu for Sri Lanka v India in Chandigarh in 1990/91
Saeed Anwar for Pakistan v West Indies in Faisalabad in 1990/91
Allan Donald for South Africa v West Indies in Bridgetown in 1991/92
Stephen Peall for Zimbabwe v Pakistan in Karachi in 1993/94
Peter McIntyre for Australia v England at the Adelaide Oval in 1994/95
Dirk Viljoen for Zimbabwe v Pakistan in Bulawayo in 1997/98
Gavin Hamilton for England v South Africa in Johannesburg in 1999/00
James Franklin for New Zealand v Pakistan in Auckland in 2000/01
Alamgir Kabir for Bangladesh v Sri Lanka in Colombo in 2002/03
Hasantha Fernando for Sri Lanka v South Africa in Johannesburg in 2002/03
Lasith Malinga for Sri Lanka v Australia in Darwin in 2003/04
Chamara Silva for Sri Lanka v New Zealand in Christchurch in 2006/07
Chris Tremlett for England v India at Lord's in 2007
Mark Gillespie for New Zealand v South Africa at Centurion in 2007/08
Dean Elgar for South Africa v Australia at Perth in 2012/13
Natsai M'shangwe for Zimbabwe v Bangladesh at Khulna in 2014
Rajendra Chandrika for West Indies v Australia at Sabina Park in 2015
Alzarri Joseph for West Indies v India in St Lucia in 2016
Kamrul Islam Rabbi for Bangladesh v England in Chittagong in 2016
Chadd Sayers for Australia v South Africa in Johannesburg in 2018
Andrew Balbirnie for Ireland v Pakistan in Malahide in 2018
Abdul Malik for Afghanistan v Zimbabwe in Abu Dhabi in 2021

Consecutive pairs
These batsmen all bagged pairs in two Tests in a row.
Bobby Peel (England, 1894–95)
Bob Crisp (South Africa, 1935–36)
Wayne Clark (Australia, 1977–78)
Pat Pocock (England, 1984)
Bob Holland (Australia, 1985/1985-86)
Mark Waugh (Australia, 1992–93)
Glenn McGrath (Australia, 1998–99)
Ajit Agarkar (India, 1999–2000)
Merv Dillon (West Indies, 1998-99/2000–01)
Dinanath Ramnarine (West Indies, 2001–02)
Shabbir Ahmed (Pakistan, 2005/2005–06)
Nuwan Pradeep (Sri Lanka, 2017–18)
Khaled Ahmed (Bangladesh, 2021−22)

In recognition of his consecutive Test pairs, Mark Waugh, who had scored a century on his Test debut, was temporarily nicknamed "Audi", after the car-maker with the four-circle logo.  His teammates pointed out that if he had scored five Test ducks in a row, he could have been nicknamed "Olympic". Both expressions have since become part of the terminology of the game, and in Test cricket, three players have actually completed an Olympic: Bob Holland (Australia, 1985), Ajit Agarkar (India, 1999–2000) and Mohammad Asif (Pakistan, 2006).

Pairs by Test captains
25 captains have been dismissed for a pair.
Joe Darling for Australia v England at Sheffield in 1902
Louis Tancred for South Africa v England at The Oval in 1912
Vijay Hazare for India v England at Kanpur in 1951/52
Harry Cave for New Zealand v West Indies at Dunedin in 1955/56
Frank Worrell for West Indies v Australia at Melbourne in 1960/61
Richie Benaud for Australia v England at Leeds in 1961
Imtiaz Ahmed for Pakistan v England at Dhaka in 1961/62
Bishen Bedi for India v England at Delhi in 1976/77
Ian Botham for England v Australia at Lord's in 1981
Allan Border for Australia v West Indies at Perth in 1992/93
Mark Taylor for Australia v Pakistan at Karachi in 1994/95
Stephen Fleming for New Zealand v Australia at Hobart in 1997/98
Courtney Walsh for West Indies v Pakistan at Rawalpindi in 1997/98
Rashid Latif for Pakistan v South Africa at Port Elizabeth in 1997/98
Nasser Hussain for England v West Indies at The Oval in 2000
Jimmy Adams for West Indies v Australia at Melbourne in 2000/01
Waqar Younis for Pakistan v Australia at Sharjah in 2002/03
Habibul Bashar for Bangladesh v Zimbabwe at Harare in 2003/04
Marvan Atapattu for Sri Lanka v Pakistan at Faisalabad in 2004/05
Darren Sammy for West Indies v New Zealand at Wellington in 2013/14
AB de Villiers for South Africa v England at Centurion in 2015/16
Faf du Plessis for South Africa v Pakistan at Centurion in 2018/19
Sarfaraz Ahmed for Pakistan v South Africa at Centurion in 2018/19
Mominul Haque for Bangladesh v India at Eden Gardens, Kolkata in 2019/20
Temba Bavuma for South Africa v West Indies at Centurion Park, Centurion in 2022/23

Sarfaraz Ahmed and Faf du Plessis made pairs in the same match, the first time this had happened in the same Test.

Pairs by designated Wicket-keepers in Tests
52 wicket-keepers have been dismissed for a pair.

In July 2019, Jonny Bairstow and Gary Wilson were dismissed without scoring in both innings of the same Test match. It was the first instance of both designated wicket-keepers being dismissed for a pair in a completed Test.

King pairs in Test cricket
If a batsman is out first ball he has made a golden duck and if a batsman is dismissed first ball in both innings he has achieved a king pair. This worst of all batting fates has befallen 22 players in the history of Test cricket so far.

William Attewell for England v Australia at Sydney in 1891–92
Ernie Hayes for England v South Africa at Cape Town in 1905-06
Bert Vogler for South Africa v Australia at Sydney in 1910–11
Tommy Ward for South Africa v Australia at Old Trafford in 1912. Tommy Ward was dismissed in each innings by Jimmy Matthews. Uniquely, both times he came in to bat after two batsmen had been dismissed, giving Matthews a hat-trick in each innings.
Robert Crisp for South Africa at Kingsmead in 1935-36
Ian Colquhoun for New Zealand v England at Eden Park in 1954–55, twice giving Bob Appleyard a hat-trick opportunity which was denied by Alex Moir each time; the second innings was part of New Zealand's 26 all out which is the lowest team score in a Test match.
Colin Wesley for South Africa v England at Trent Bridge in 1960
Bhagwat Chandrasekhar for India v Australia at Melbourne in 1977–78
Gary Troup for New Zealand v India at Wellington in 1980–81
Dave Richardson for South Africa v Pakistan at Johannesburg in 1994–95 
Adam Huckle for Zimbabwe v Pakistan at Harare in 1997–98 
Ajit Agarkar for India v Australia at Melbourne in 1999–2000
Adam Gilchrist for Australia v India at Kolkata in 2000–01
Javed Omar for Bangladesh v India at Dhaka in 2007
Ryan Harris for Australia v England at Adelaide in December 2010
Virender Sehwag for India v England at Edgbaston in August 2011
Rangana Herath for Sri Lanka v Pakistan at Sharjah in January 2014
Dhammika Prasad for Sri Lanka v Pakistan at Pallekele in June 2015
James Anderson for England v India at Vishakhapatnam in November 2016
Nuwan Pradeep for Sri Lanka v Pakistan at Sheikh Zayed Stadium in September 2017
Nurul Hasan for Bangladesh v West Indies at Kingston in July 2018
Sam Curran for England v India at Lords in August 2021

Notable pairs in first-class cricket
King Pairs have been 'bagged' by many players in first-class cricket. Mick Norman of Northamptonshire bagged a king pair in a single day against Glamorgan at St. Helen's in Swansea in June 1964.

When Glamorgan followed on against the Indians at Cardiff Arms Park in June 1946, last man Peter Judge was bowled for a duck by Chandra Sarwate to end the county's first innings. Invited to follow-on, Glamorgan's captain Johnny Clay, who was the non-striker, decided to waive the 10-minute interval between innings, remained in the middle with Judge, and reversed the entire batting order. Sarwate then bowled Judge again, second ball, incidentally with the same ball, and Judge thus achieved the fastest pair in the history of first-class cricket.
Zimbabwe opening bat Hamilton Masakadza completed an unusual pair when he was dismissed for a Test duck twice on the same day, 28 January 2012, when his team's two innings were completed within a day. Another notable pair was made by Neil Harvey on 27 July 1956. Playing in the test where Jim Laker took 19 for 90, Harvey completed a pair within about 2 hours on the second day.

Unofficial pairs in Twenty20 cricket
In limited overs games decided by a Super Over, it is possible for a batsman to be dismissed for a duck in both the regular innings and the super over. Since runs made in super overs are not counted towards a player's statistical record, this is sometimes referred to an "unofficial pair". On 25 July 2013, Shoaib Malik scored an unofficial golden pair for Pakistan International Airlines against Habib Bank Limited, while on 10 January 2014, Moisés Henriques scored an unofficial pair playing for the Sydney Sixers against the Perth Scorchers. On 20 September 2020, during the second match of the 2020 Indian Premier League, Nicholas Pooran scored an unofficial pair playing for Kings XI Punjab against the Delhi Capitals.

References 

Test cricket records
Cricket-related lists